Peter Russo (born 29 October 1959) is a former Australian rules footballer who played for Hawthorn in the Victorian Football League (VFL) during the 1980s. After a 1988 season where he played only eight senior games, Russo, alongside Paul Harding and Robert Handley, was traded to St Kilda in exchange for the first choice in the 1988 VFL Draft. Russo spent three seasons with the Saints, although he did not play a single game in 1991 due to a knee reconstruction and retired in June of that year.

Mostly used as a ruck-rover and in the forward pocket, Russo could also play in the back pocket and wing. He started his career with Hawthorn in 1978 and was a member of their 1978 premiership side. Russo missed out on Hawthorn's 1983 premiership through injury but was a premiership player again in 1986. In 1985 he represented Victoria at interstate football. Post-retirement he became a mathematics teacher at multiple high schools.

References

External links

1959 births
Living people
St Kilda Football Club players
Hawthorn Football Club players
Hawthorn Football Club Premiership players
People educated at Mentone Grammar School
Australian rules footballers from Victoria (Australia)
Australian people of Italian descent
Two-time VFL/AFL Premiership players